William Nicoll Jr. (1702 – 1768) was an English-American colonial merchant and politician who served as the Speaker of the New York General Assembly.

Early life
He was a son of English-born politician William Nicoll (1657–1723) (who is remembered for his vehement opposition to the Leisler Rebellion) and Anna (née Van Rensselaer) Nicoll (1665–1723), widow of the patroon Kiliaen van Rensselaer, and daughter of Jeremias van Rensselaer and Maria (née Van Cortlandt) Van Rensselaer. Among his siblings was Mary Nicoll, wife of Robert Watts; Benjamin Nicoll, husband of Charity Floyd;  Catherine Nicoll, wife of Jonathan Havens; and Frances Nicoll, wife of Edward Holland, the 40th mayor of New York City.

His paternal grandparents were Abigail (née Johns) Nicoll and Matthias Nicoll, who served as the 6th Mayor of New York City from 1672 to 1673.  His grand-uncle was Richard Nicolls, the 1st Colonial governor of the Province of New York. His paternal aunt, Margaret Nicoll, was married to Col. Richard Floyd Jr., the colonel of provincial troops of Suffolk County and judge of the Court of Common Pleas and grandfather of William Floyd.

Career
His father was granted a royal patent of 50,000 acres on the Long Island by Governor Thomas Dongan in November 1683, later receiving further land grants making Plandome Manor the largest on Long Island totaling .

Nicoll was elected a member of the New York General Assembly, representing Suffolk County, in 1739 and, like his father, served until his death in 1768.  From January 31, 1759 until February 6, 1768, he also served as the Speaker of the Assembly.  During his service as Speaker, the 18th Assembly was dissolved for a short period of time upon the death of George II which occurred on October 25, 1760.

Personal life
As Nicoll died unmarried and without issue, the Nicoll estate was inherited by his nephew, William Nicoll III (d. 1778), the eldest son of Benjamin, who became the third family member to be elected to the General Assembly where he served from 1768 until 1769.

References

18th-century American politicians
1702 births
1768 deaths
Members of the New York General Assembly
Speakers of the New York General Assembly
William 1702